Ivory Coast, also known as Côte d'Ivoire and officially as the Republic of Côte d'Ivoire, competed at the 2020 Summer Olympics in Tokyo. Originally scheduled to take place from 24 July to 9 August 2020, the Games were postponed to 23 July to 8 August 2021, because of the COVID-19 pandemic. It was the nation's fourteenth appearance at the Summer Olympics.

Medalists

Competitors
The following is the list of number of competitors in the Games. Note that reserves in football are not counted:

Athletics

Ivorian athletes achieved the entry standards, either by qualifying time or by world ranking, in the following track and field events (up to a maximum of 3 athletes in each event):

Track & road events

Football

Summary

Men's tournament

Ivory Coast men's football team qualified for the Games by advancing to the final match of the 2019 Africa U-23 Cup of Nations, signifying the country's recurrence to the Olympic tournament after a twelve-year absence.

Team roster

Group play

Quarter final

Judo

Ivory Coast qualified one judoka for the women's lightweight category (57 kg) at the Games. Rio 2016 Olympian Zouleiha Abzetta Dabonne accepted a continental berth from Africa as the nation's top-ranked judoka outside of direct qualifying position in the IJF World Ranking List of June 28, 2021.

Rowing

Ivory Coast qualified one boat in the men's single sculls for the Games by finishing sixth in the A-final and securing the fourth of five berths available at the 2019 FISA African Olympic Qualification Regatta in Tunis, Tunisia, marking the country's debut in the sport.

Qualification Legend: FA=Final A (medal); FB=Final B (non-medal); FC=Final C (non-medal); FD=Final D (non-medal); FE=Final E (non-medal); FF=Final F (non-medal); SA/B=Semifinals A/B; SC/D=Semifinals C/D; SE/F=Semifinals E/F; QF=Quarterfinals; R=Repechage

Swimming

Ivory Coast received a universality invitation from FINA to send a top-ranked female swimmer in her respective individual events to the Olympics, based on the FINA Points System of June 28, 2021.

Taekwondo

Ivory Coast entered four athletes into the taekwondo competition at the Games. Defending Olympic champion Cheick Sallah Cissé (men's 80 kg) and Rio 2016 bronze medalist Ruth Gbagbi (women's 67 kg) qualified directly for their respective weight classes by finishing among the top five taekwondo practitioners at the end of the WT Olympic Rankings. Meanwhile, reigning African Games champion Seydou Gbané and twenty-year-old rookie Aminata Traoré secured the remaining spots on the Ivorian taekwondo squad with a top two finish each in the men's (+80 kg) and women's heavyweight category (+67 kg), respectively at the 2020 African Qualification Tournament in Rabat, Morocco.

References

External links
 Côte d'Ivoire at the 2020 Summer Olympics at Olympedia

Nations at the 2020 Summer Olympics
2020
2021 in Ivorian sport